Acirsa is a genus of predatory sea snails, marine prosobranch gastropod mollusks in the family Epitoniidae. They are commonly known as wentletraps.

Species
According to the World Register of Marine Species, the following species with valid names are included within the genus Acirsa :
 Acirsa amara Kilburn, 1985
 Acirsa antarctica (E. A. Smith, 1907)
 Acirsa borealis (Lyell, 1841) - chalky wentletrap, Okhotsk wentletrap
 Acirsa cerralvoensis (DuShane, 1970)
 Acirsa coarctata (Jeffreys, 1884)
 Acirsa coarctata coarctata  (Jeffreys, J.G., 1884)
 Acirsa coarctata distantespirata  Nordsieck, F., 1972
 Acirsa cookiana (Dell, 1956)
 Acirsa martensi (de Boury, 1913)
 Acirsa mcleani Sirenko, 2009
 Acirsa morsei (Yokoyama, 1926)
 Acirsa murrha (DuShane, 1970)
 Acirsa ochotensis (Middendorff, 1848)
 Acirsa subdecussata (Cantraine, 1835)
 Acirsa symphylla (Martens, 1878)

The following species are also named by ITIS and in the book  New Zealand Mollusca, by A. Powell 
 Acirsa americana  Wade, B., 1926
 Acirsa bezanconi  Boury, E.A. de, 1883
 Acirsa clathrata  Sohl, N.F., 1964
 Acirsa cretacea  (Wade, B., 1917)
 Acirsa culmosa  Sohl, N.F., 1964
 Acirsa elatum  (Suter, H., 1917)
 Acirsa entrichti  Nordsieck, F., 1968
 Acirsa eschrichti  Hölboll, 1842
 Acirsa flexicostata  Sohl, N.F., 1964
 Acirsa gravida  Sohl, N.F., 1964
 Acirsa implexa Sohl, N.F., 1964
 Acirsa microstriata  Wade, B., 1917
 Acirsa otogoensis  Stilwell, J.D., 1994
 Acirsa pelagica  (Risso, A., 1826)
 Acirsa subcarinata  Murdoch, R. & H. Suter, 1906
 Acirsa turrita  Parona, 1894
 Acirsa vayssierei
 Acirsa wadei Cossmann, A.E.M., 1925

Species brought into synonymy 
 Acirsa annectens A. W. B. Powell, 1951: synonym of Gregorioiscala annectens (A. W. B. Powell, 1951)
 Acirsa berryi: synonym of Couthouyella menesthoides (Carpenter, 1864)
 Acirsa chitaniana  (Yokoyama, 1926): synonym of Acirsa martensi (de Boury, 1913)
 Acirsa corsicana Nordsieck F., 1974 : synonym of Acirsa subdecussata (Cantraine, 1835)
 Acirsa costulata: synonym of Acirsa borealis (Lyell, 1841)
 Acirsa exopleura : synonym of Opalia exopleura (Dall, 1917)
 Acirsa gracilis : synonym of Periapta pandion (Clench & Turner, 1952)
 Acirsa hedleyi (de Boury, 1912): synonym of Amaea hedleyi (de Boury, 1912)
 Acirsa menesthoides: synonym of Couthouyella menesthoides (Carpenter, 1864)
 Acirsa praelonga Jeffreys, 1877: synonym of Papuliscala praelonga (Jeffreys, 1877)
 Acirsa sarsii Kobelt, 1903: synonym of Gregorioiscala sarsii (Kobelt, 1903)
 Acirsa undulata: synonym of Acirsa borealis (Lyell, 1841)

Some new species (Acirsa alpha, Acirsa beta, Acirsa delta, and Acirsa epsilon) have been named by Squires and Saul in 2003

References

External links

 Acirsa subdecussata : D. Dhora : Mollusks of Albania; Arch. Biol. Sci., Belgrade, 61 (3), 537-553, 2009
 Gofas, S.; Le Renard, J.; Bouchet, P. (2001). Mollusca, in: Costello, M.J. et al. (Ed.) (2001). European register of marine species: a check-list of the marine species in Europe and a bibliography of guides to their identification. Collection Patrimoines Naturels, 50: pp. 180–213

Epitoniidae
Taxa named by Otto Andreas Lowson Mörch